Ellen Bryan Moore (April 13, 1912 – February 20, 1999) was an American politician who served as Louisiana Register of State Lands from 1952 to 1956 and 1960 to 1976.

Biography
Moore was born in Baton Rouge, Louisiana (where her grandfather served as mayor) on April 13, 1912. Her father, Alexander Bryan, had served as the warden of the Louisiana State Penitentiary. She received her bachelor's degree from the Louisiana State University. During World War II, Moore was a member of the Women's Army Corps and was a unit commander. She ran for Louisiana Register of State Lands against Lucille May Grace in 1948, before finally winning the position in 1952. After Grace took back the seat in 1956, she returned in 1960 and later served until 1976. Her position entailed the responsibility of administrating property owned by the state of Louisiana. She was also a heritage preserver, as was indicated in her efforts to salvage a Civil War battlefield near Baton Rouge.

She was inducted to the Louisiana Center for Women in Government and Business Hall of Fame in 1995. After suffering a stroke in October the previous year, she died on February 20, 1999.

References

1912 births
1999 deaths
Educators from Louisiana
American women educators
United States Army personnel of World War II
American real estate businesspeople
Louisiana Democrats
Louisiana State University alumni
Politicians from Baton Rouge, Louisiana
Registers of the State Land Office of Louisiana
United States Army officers
University of Louisiana at Lafayette alumni
Women in Louisiana politics
20th-century American businesspeople
Burials at Magnolia Cemetery (Baton Rouge, Louisiana)
20th-century American women